The Girard Sailors were a short-lived minor league baseball team that existed briefly in 1908. The team represented Girard, Ohio as a member of the Ohio–Pennsylvania League. After posting an 0–9 record, the team moved to Butler, Pennsylvania, on May 19, 1908, to become that city's unnamed team. Less than a month later, on June 15, 1908, the club moved to Erie, Pennsylvania, to become the second incarnation of the Erie Sailors.

Year-by-year record

Baseball teams established in 1908
Baseball teams disestablished in 1908
Defunct minor league baseball teams
1908 establishments in Ohio
1908 disestablishments in Ohio
Defunct baseball teams in Ohio
Ohio-Pennsylvania League teams